The Ambassador of the United Kingdom to Libya is the United Kingdom's foremost diplomatic representative in Libya, and head of the UK's diplomatic mission in Tripoli.

 the British Embassy in Tripoli suspended operations due to renewed civil war in Libya. The ambassador and staff operate from Tunisia for the time being.

In September 2021, Caroline Hurndall MBE became the first female British Ambassador to Tripoli, replacing Nicholas (Nick) Hopton.

Consul-General in Tripoli
1 April 1894: Thomas Sampson Jago

Ambassadors
1952–1954: Alec Kirkbride
1955–1959: Walter Graham
1959–1961: Derek Riches
1962–1963: Andrew Stewart
1964–1969: Roderick Sarell
1969–1970: Donald Maitland
1970–1974: Peter Tripp
1974–1976: Donald Murray
1977–1980: Anthony Williams
1980–1983: Michael Edes
1984: Oliver Miles
Diplomatic relations were broken over the murder of WPC Yvonne Fletcher in 1984. Britain and Libya resumed diplomatic relations in July 1999.
1999–2002: Richard Dalton
2002–2006: Anthony Layden
2006–2010: Vincent Fean
2010–2011: Richard Northern
From March to October 2011 the British Embassy in Tripoli was closed due to the Libyan Civil War.
2011 Oct–Nov: Sir John Jenkins
2011–2012: Sir Dominic Asquith
2013–2015: Michael Aron
2015–2018: Peter Millett
2018–2019: Frank Baker
2019–2019: Martin Reynolds
2019–2021 Nicholas Hopton

2021-present: Caroline Hurndall

References

External links
British Embassy Tripoli

Libya
 
United Kingdom